Harvey Jerome Clayton (born April 4, 1961) is a former professional American football player who played cornerback for five seasons for the Pittsburgh Steelers and New York Giants. Clayton is the uncle of NFL Safety Antrel Rolle.

1961 births
Living people
Sportspeople from Miami-Dade County, Florida
Players of American football from Florida
American football cornerbacks
Florida State Seminoles football players
Pittsburgh Steelers players
New York Giants players
People from Kendall, Florida